Ismail Liban Haji Mohamed (born 29 June 2001) is a Somali footballer who plays as a midfielder for Green Gully and the Somalia national team.

Club career
In 2021, following short spells at Bayswater City and Floreat Athena, Liban signed for Cockburn City.

International career
On 15 June 2021, Liban made his debut for Somalia, in a 1–0 friendly loss against Djibouti.

References

2001 births
Living people
Association football midfielders
Floreat Athena FC players
Somalian footballers
Australian soccer players
Somalia international footballers
National Premier Leagues players